Ribeira de Calhau is a settlement in the eastern part of the island of Sao Vicente, Cape Verde. It takes its name from the river Ribeira do Calhau, and comprises the villages of Madeiral, Ribeira de Calhau and Calhau. Madeiral and Ribeira de Calhau are located in the river valley, Calhau is on the east coast. In 2010 its population was 1,177. The valley is surrounded by the mountains Viana, Madeiral, Pico do Vento and Monte Verde. 

The Cape Verde Atmospheric Observatory "Humberto Duarte Fonseca" is situated 1 km north of Calhau. It is part of a German-UK initiative to undertake long-term ground- and ocean-based observations in the tropical Eastern North Atlantic Ocean region.

Climate
Calhau has a hot desert climate like most of the island. The average annual temperature is 22.6 °C.  Average rainfall is 129 millimeters.

Notable person
Vasco Martins, singer and composer

References

Villages and settlements in São Vicente, Cape Verde
Populated coastal places in Cape Verde